Richard Goddard (died 1596) was an English politician.

He was a Member (MP) of the Parliament of England for Southampton in 1589.

References

Year of birth missing
1596 deaths
English MPs 1589